The Commodore Schuyler F. Heim Bridge was a vertical-lift bridge in the Port of Los Angeles. Dedicated on January 10, 1948, the bridge allowed State Route 47 (the Terminal Island Freeway) to cross over the Cerritos Channel. Named after Schuyler F. Heim, who was in command of the Naval Air Station on Terminal Island in 1942, the bridge was one of the largest vertical-lift bridges on the West Coast. The bridge was decommissioned on October 12, 2015 and replaced by a new, six-lane fixed-span bridge in order to meet current safety and earthquake standards. A replacement bridge, tentatively titled State Route 47 Schuyler Heim Bridge Replacement, was completed in September 2020.

History

Early connections to Terminal Island
The San Pedro, Los Angeles and Utah Railroad was incorporated on October 8, 1887 with the goal to build a line from Rattlesnake Island (renamed Terminal Island by 1897) on the east side of San Pedro Bay to Utah. The same "English syndicate" which had purchased Catalina Island was said to have secured the right-of-way between Los Angeles and Rattlesnake Island in 1889, with plans to have the rail line operated by the Santa Fe. However, the Los Angeles Terminal Railway, which had purchased Rattlesnake Island and the right-of-way by 1890, was the first to build tracks on the island, completing the line along the western and northern sides of the island to Long Beach on November 7, 1891, as the start of a planned transcontinental route. The line included a  pile bridge spanning the mouth of the Los Angeles River, near the present site of the Gerald Desmond Bridge.

Since the trestle bridge effectively blocked marine traffic from passing through the east end of Cerritos Slough, the War Department ordered the Salt Lake Railroad to demolish it in 1906. Although a  tunnel was proposed as a replacement in February 1907, the Salt Lake had already applied to replace the fixed trestle span with a drawbridge in September 1906. The location for the new drawbridge was set in May 1907, and the first piles were driven in December 1907. The bridge was completed in 1908 as a Scherzer Rolling Lift Bridge.

However, the widened channel would require the newly-renamed Salt Lake Railroad to move its tracks on Terminal Island and remove its 1908 bridge. After several years of negotiation, a compromise was reached. After widening, the waterway was renamed Cerritos Channel. As part of the compromise, in exchange for Salt Lake moving its tracks and ceding land to accommodate the widened channel, the city took on obligations to reconstruct wharves and build a replacement bridge. That replacement bridge was completed in 1924 as the Badger Avenue Bridge (later renamed to Henry Ford Bridge), a double-leaf bascule bridge wide enough to accommodate two railroad tracks and two lanes for road traffic. The 1908 bridge was moved to Washington State in 1934, where it is still in use as a bridge for BNSF Railway over the Cowlitz River near its mouth at Longview.

Despite these early rail bridges, a road bridge was keenly desired by residents of Terminal Island, who had asked for a wagon bridge in 1894 and again in 1906.

1948 Schuyler Heim vertical-lift bridge

1924 also saw work begin on a Naval Air Base San Pedro at Terminal Island. Port traffic continued to increase and the United States Navy began to expand its presence on Terminal Island in the early 1940s, including an expanded air base. Expansion plans for the Navy called for more workers than could be accommodated over the Henry Ford Bridge, so the Navy commissioned a new road bridge in 1941. Construction on the bridge began in 1946. The Chief Engineer for the project until October 1947 was H. E. Wilson.  The bridge was named in honor of Commodore Schuyler Franklin Heim, who was in command of the Naval Air Station on Terminal Island in 1942.

The state of California took over operation of the bridge from the city of Los Angeles in 1964. As of 1988, the bridge was being raised frequently, about 8,500 times per year.

Replacement fixed-span bridge
The State Route 47 Schuyler Heim Bridge Replacement project replaced the liftspan portion of the original bridge with a fixed-span bridge. The replacement bridge has a total of six lanes for vehicular traffic, three in each direction, and span . Construction was expected to complete in early 2017, but was delayed to late 2020.

Work on the replacement bridge began in 2011 and was finished in September 2020.

Design
The deck of the bridge was an open grid design to decrease weight and ease lifting of the bridge to allow ship traffic to pass underneath.  The bridge used > counterweights to lift the deck span portion to allow tall-masted vessels underneath.

State Route 47 and the connecting State Route 103 are heavily used by trucks to bypass part of the crowded Interstate 710 freeway.  Due to the large amount of heavy truck traffic over the bridge, the deck was subject to excessive wear.  The deck was completely replaced in 1997 but was still under extreme distress.  The California Department of Transportation (Caltrans) installed eight experimental fiber reinforced polymer (FRP) panels and attached sensors to test stress, load bearing, and temperature variations of the panels to determine their effectiveness as a permanent replacement. Chicago-based engineering firm CTLGroup installed strain gages and thermocouples within the layers of the FRP. Each month, technicians perform a remote static load test of the bridge, providing direction to onsite Caltrans staff while monitoring real-time data from the firm's Chicago office.

In popular culture

 The bridge is seen in the opening credits of the American television series Mannix. Mike Connors, playing Joe Mannix, is seen running across the bridge.
 It was also seen on an episode of the 1970s TV series Emergency!.
 The bridge plays a key role in the plot of the 2010 film Inception.
 A representation of the bridge is shown in the fictional city of Los Santos in the 2013 video game Grand Theft Auto V.
 The bridge is also seen in The Bilderberg Club 'Meet the Shadow One World Government," a 2009 film by Chris M. Allport.

See also
Henry Ford Bridge — adjacent railroad bridge
Vincent Thomas Bridge

References

External links

Bridges in Los Angeles County, California
Demolished bridges in the United States
Demolished buildings and structures in Los Angeles
Former road bridges in the United States
Los Angeles Harbor Region
Terminal Island
Road bridges in California
Vertical lift bridges in California
Bridges completed in 1948
Buildings and structures demolished in 2016
1948 establishments in California
2016 disestablishments in California
Historic American Engineering Record in California